Liangtian Township is a township under the administration of Jiexi County, Guangdong, China. , it has one residential community and 10 villages under its administration.

References 

Township-level divisions of Guangdong
Jiexi County